The 1968 Paris–Tours was the 62nd edition of the Paris–Tours cycle race and was held on 6 October 1968. The race started in Paris and finished in Tours. The race was won by Guido Reybrouck.

General classification

References

1968 in French sport
1968
1968 Super Prestige Pernod
October 1968 sports events in Europe